Husam Kamal (Arabic:حسام كمال) (born 25 January 1996) is a Qatari footballer. He currently plays for Qatar.

Club 
Al-Sadd
Qatar Cup: 2021

External links

References

1996 births
Living people
Qatari footballers
Qatari expatriate footballers
Aspire Academy (Qatar) players
Al Sadd SC players
Al-Arabi SC (Qatar) players
Al-Rayyan SC players
Umm Salal SC players
Qatar SC players
Qatar Stars League players
Association football fullbacks
Expatriate footballers in France
Qatari expatriate sportspeople in France